Şirinyer station is an underground railway station on the Southern Line of the İZBAN commuter rail system. The current station was built between 2006–09 and opened on 30 August 2010. The former station was opened in 1858 by the Ottoman Railway Company and was taken over by the Turkish State Railways in 1935. Before the 1950s, Şirinyer was known as Kızılçullu Durağı.

The proposed Üçyol—Çamlıkule Line of the İzmir Metro will have an underground station at Şirinyer. Construction of the station is expected to begin in 2018 and enter operation in 2022.

Bus connections
ESHOT
 36 Şirinyer Aktarma - Konak
 70 Şirinyer Aktarma - Halkapınar Metro
 74 Şirinyer Aktarma - Yenigün Mahallesi
 418 Şirinyer Aktarma - Halkapınar Metro
 441 Şirinyer Aktarma - Çınartepe
 466 Şirinyer Aktarma - Konak
 476 Şirinyer Aktarma - Tınaztepe
 485 Şirinyer Aktarma - Gaziemir Semt Garajı
 676 Şirinyer Aktarma - Tınaztepe
 805 Şirinyer Aktarma - Çamlıkule
 818 Şirinyer Aktarma - Esbaş Aktarma
 838 Şirinyer Aktarma - Konak
 866 Şirinyer Aktarma - Buca Toplu Konutları
 871 Şirinyer Aktarma - İşçievleri
 874 Şirinyer Aktarma - İzkent
 875 Şirinyer Aktarma - Evka 1
 876 Şirinyer Aktarma - Şirinkapı
 878 Şirinyer Aktarma - Tınaztepe

References

External links
TCDD Official Site

Railway stations in İzmir Province
Railway stations opened in 1858
1858 establishments in the Ottoman Empire
Buca District